"Pandora's Box" (subtitled "It's a Long, Long Way" for the US release) is a song by English electronic band Orchestral Manoeuvres in the Dark (OMD), released as the second single from their eighth studio album, Sugar Tax, on 24 June 1991. The song, which deals with the less glamorous side of celebrity, was inspired by silent film actress Louise Brooks and is named after the 1929 film Pandora's Box in which she starred.

The single was a top-10 hit in the United Kingdom and throughout Europe. Three remixes were made for this release, remixed by Danny Griffiths, Carl Segal, and Steve Anderson respectively. Anderson's shorter remix is the main single version. Additional remixes and edits appear on promotional and limited editions.

Reception
The Huddersfield Daily Examiner named "Pandora's Box" their "Single of the Week", observing a "slice of synthesizer sophistication" whose "peculiar guitar twang really makes it". KROQ ranked it the 21st-greatest song of 1991, while MTV Europe placed it 55th. In a retrospective review for AllMusic, critic Dave Thompson noted a "fabulous dance-fired arrangement", a "jubilant melody" and a "bounding rhythm that defies efforts not to dance along". He noted that the song's upbeat sound belies the "tragic tale" of its lyrics, which handle the "downside of fame and fortune".

Music video
The video is in black and white and features Louise Brooks and singer Andy McCluskey. According to the video intro, all of the scenes of Brooks in the video are from the original 1929 film.

Track listings

UK 7-inch and cassette single
A. "Pandora's Box"
B. "All She Wants Is Everything"

UK 12-inch single
A1. "Pandora's Box" (Constant Pressure 12-inch mix)
A2. "All She Wants Is Everything"
B1. "Pandora's Box" (Abstract mix)

UK CD1
 "Pandora's Box"
 "All She Wants Is Everything"
 "Pandora's Box" (Constant Pressure 12-inch mix)
 "Pandora's Box" (Diesel Fingers 12-inch mix)

UK CD2
 "Pandora's Box"
 "Pandora's Box" (Lost Girl mix)
 "Pandora's Box" (Abstract mix)
 "Pandora's Box" (American Venus 7-inch mix)

US cassette single
 "Pandora's Box (It's a Long, Long Way)"
 "Sugar Tax"

US 12-inch single
A1. "Pandora's Box (It's a Long, Long Way)" (Diesel Fingers mix) – 6:10
A2. "Pandora's Box (It's a Long, Long Way)" (Abstract mix) – 6:37
B1. "Pandora's Box (It's a Long, Long Way)" (Constant Pressure 12-inch) – 4:48
B2. "Pandora's Box (It's a Long, Long Way)" (Prize of Beauty mix) – 5:35
B3. "Sugar Tax" – 4:07

US CD single
 "Pandora's Box (It's a Long, Long Way)" (Andy McCluskey 7-inch) – 4:04
 "Pandora's Box (It's a Long, Long Way)" (Constant Pressure 12-inch) – 4:48
 "Sugar Tax" – 4:07
 "All She Wants Is Everything" – 4:22

Australian CD and cassette single
 "Pandora's Box"
 "If You Leave"
 "We Love You"
 "Locomotion"
 "All She Wants Is Everthing"

Charts

Weekly charts

Year-end charts

Cover versions
 Estonian singer Jüri Homenja made a cover version of the song named "Pandora laegas".

References

External links
 Lyrics
 Pandora's Box video

1991 singles
Orchestral Manoeuvres in the Dark songs